Southwest Legacy High School is a senior high school in San Antonio, Texas, with a Von Ormy postal address. It is a part of the Southwest Independent School District.

Financed by a bond passed in 2012, it had a cost of $68 million and has a capacity of 3,200 students. It opened in 2017, on August 28. In the period 1962–2017 it was the first traditional comprehensive high school, operated by a school district, in southern San Antonio, as well as, from 1977 to 2017, the first public high school established south of  U.S. Route 90.

References

External links
 Southwest Legacy High School
 https://fesmag.com/departments/chain-news-profiles/15848-introducing-dining-and-culinary-arts-at-southwest-legacy-high-school

High schools in San Antonio